Apple Lane is a tabletop role-playing game adventure for RuneQuest, originally published by Chaosium in 1978. Set in Greg Stafford's world of Glorantha, Apple Lane is a small hamlet that provides the basis for three adventures. Subsequent updates for new editions of RuneQuest and HeroQuest focus only on the hamlet, updating its timeline. There are also a number of licensed and foreign language editions.

Publication history
Apple Lane was first published in 1978 as Scenario Pack 2, the second published adventure for RuneQuest, and is set in the Gloranthan year of 1613. 1987 saw it updated to Avalon Hill's third edition of RuneQuest, it featured a colour cover, redrawn maps, new art, and pullout reference section. 2009 saw it updated for HeroQuest, 2nd edition. Return to Apple Lane published by Moon Design Publications advanced the timeline by three years to 1616, and was later included in the Sartar Companion in a slightly modified form. Although containing new character art, the maps were from the first edition, and it did not contain Tribal Initiation or The Rainbow Mounds adventures. The original edition was republished in 2016 in softcover and PDF format as part of Chaosium's RuneQuest: Classic Edition Kickstarter. 2019 saw Apple Lane appear in Chaosium's RuneQuest - Gamemaster Screen Pack Adventure book. In the book's first adventure, Defending Apple Lane, the setting was updated to the year 1625 and the hamlet become a starting base for new adventurers. This edition did not contain Tribal Initiation or The Rainbow Mounds. 2020 saw the release of a POD version of the Classic edition.

Contents
The earliest publications of the book contained three adventures set around Apple Lane, a small hamlet in the land of Sartar. 
 The introductory adventure Tribal Initiation introduces players to RuneQuest and the people of the hamlet. It is a simple Initiation ceremony.
 The titular adventure Apple Lane takes place in one of the hamlet's buildings, Gringle's Pawnshop. The adventure focuses on the defence of the building from an attack.
 The final adventure The Rainbow Mounds, takes place at local caves, where a troll bandit must be brought to justice.

The 2009 and 2010 Return to Apple Lane is a 12 page adventure focussing on Gringle Goodsell, the owner of the pawnshop in the original book.

The 2018 Defending Apple Lane is a 26 page adventure and background where the adventurers must defend the hamlet from attack by bandits.

Reception
Forrest Johnson reviewed Apple Lane in The Space Gamer No. 35. Johnson commented that "This is a good supplement for novice RuneQuest referees. Things are spelled out in sufficient detail for most purposes; not much improvisation is required. The two scenarios given show a lot of imagination, and are suitable for beginning characters. [...] On the negative side, experienced characters may find Apple Lane a wee bit tame."

References

External links
 

Role-playing game supplements introduced in 1978
RuneQuest adventures